James Thomas Elam (June 6, 1920 – February 4, 1961) was an American baseball pitcher in the Negro leagues.

A native of Midlothian, Virginia, Elam played with the Newark Eagles in 1943. He served in the US Army during World War II, and died in Richmond, Virginia in 1961 at age 40.

References

External links
 and Seamheads

Newark Eagles players
1920 births
1961 deaths
Baseball players from Virginia
Baseball pitchers
African Americans in World War II
United States Army personnel of World War II
African-American United States Army personnel